Phakopsora gossypii is a plant pathogen and causal agent of cotton rust.

References

Fungal plant pathogens and diseases
Cotton diseases
Pucciniales